Devil's Gate is a 2004 British film directed by Stuart St Paul. Upon learning of her father's illness the protagonist Rachael decides to travel home - despite having previously had no intent to ever visit the town again. Her feelings for the town derive from her mistreatment by her mother. Various tragedies occur which essentially trap her on the island - mysteries soon arise. Devil's Gate was mainly filmed on the islands of Shetland, due to the stark landscape.

Cast
Laura Fraser - Rachael
Callum Blue - Rafe
Luke Aikman - Matt
Tom Bell - Jake
Roger Ashton-Griffiths - Eagle
Jean Heard - Betty
Lynda Bellingham - Marlene
Patrick Gordon - Clem
Mames Kristian - Bob

External links 
 
 

2004 films
2004 drama films
British drama films
Mass media in Shetland
2000s English-language films
2000s British films